Syriac Christianity ( / Mšiḥoyuṯo Suryoyto or Mšiḥāyūṯā Suryāytā) is a distinctive branch of Eastern Christianity, whose formative theological writings and traditional liturgies are expressed in the Classical Syriac language, a variation of the old Aramaic language. In a wider sense, the term can also refer to Aramaic Christianity in general, thus encompassing all Christian traditions that are based on liturgical uses of Aramaic language and its variations, both historical and modern.

Along with Greek and Latin, Classical Syriac was one of the three most important languages of Early Christianity. It became a vessel for the development of a distinctive Syriac form of Christianity which flourished throughout the Near East and other parts of Asia during Late Antiquity and the Early Medieval period, giving rise to various liturgical and denominational traditions, represented in modern times by several Churches which continue to uphold the religious and cultural heritage of Syriac Christianity.

Syriac Christianity comprises two liturgical traditions. 
The East Syriac Rite (also known variably as the Chaldean, Assyrian, Sassanid, Babylonian or Persian Rite), whose main anaphora is the Holy Qurbana of Saints Addai and Mari, is that of the Iraq-based Chaldean Catholic Church, Assyrian Church of the East and Ancient Church of the East, and the Indian Syro-Malabar Catholic Church and Chaldean Syrian Church (the latter being part of the Assyrian Church of the East).

The West Syriac Rite (also called Antiochian Syriac Rite or St. James Rite), which has the Divine Liturgy of Saint James as its anaphora, is that of the Syriac Orthodox Church, the Lebanon-based Maronite Church and Syriac Catholic Church, and the Indian Malankara Orthodox Syrian Church, Jacobite Syrian Christian Church (part of the Syriac Orthodox Church), Syro-Malankara Catholic Church, and Malabar Independent Syrian Church. Reformed versions of this rite are used by the Eastern Protestant Malankara Mar Thoma Syrian Church and the more strongly reformed St. Thomas Evangelical Church of India.

In India, indigenous Eastern Christians (Saint Thomas Christians) of both liturgical traditions (eastern and western) are called "Syrian" Christians. The traditional East Syriac community is represented by the Syro-Malabar Church and the Chaldean Syrian Church of India (a part of the Assyrian Church of the East). The West Syriac liturgical tradition was introduced after 1665, and the community associated with it is represented by the Jacobite Syrian Christian Church (a part of the Syriac Orthodox Church), the Malankara Orthodox Syrian Church (both of them belonging to the Oriental Orthodoxy), the Syro-Malankara Catholic Church (an Eastern Catholic Church), the Malankara Marthoma Syrian Church (part of the Anglican Communion)and the Malabar Independent Syrian Church (an independent Oriental Orthodox Church not part of the Oriental Orthodox Communion). 

The Syriac language is a variety of Aramaic language, that emerged in Edessa, Upper Mesopotamia during the first centuries AD. It is related to the Aramaic of Jesus, a Galilean dialect. This relationship added to its prestige for Christians. The form of the language in use in Edessa predominated in Christian writings and was accepted as the standard form, "a convenient vehicle for the spread of Christianity wherever there was a substrate of spoken Aramaic". The area where Syriac or Aramaic was spoken, an area of contact and conflict between the Roman Empire and the Sasanian Empire, extended from around Antioch in the west to Seleucia-Ctesiphon, the Sasanian capital (in Iraq), in the east and comprised the whole or parts of present-day Syria, Lebanon, Israel/Palestine, Iraq, and parts of Turkey and Iran.

Name

In modern English language, the term "Syriac Christianity" is preferred over the alternative form "Syrian Christianity", that was also commonly used in older literature, as a synonym, particularly during the 19th and the 20th centuries. Since the latter term proved to be very polysemic, a tendency occurred (firstly among scholars) to reduce the term "Syrian Christianity" to its primary (regional) meaning, that designates the Christianity in Syria, while more specific term (Syriac Christianity) came to be used as preferred designation for the entire Syriac branch of Eastern Christianity. That distinction is not yet universally accepted, even among scholars. It is gradually introduced in most of the English speaking world, with some notable exceptions. Churches of Syriac tradition in India still self-identify, in Indian English, as "Syrian" Churches, both for sociolinguistic and legal reasons.

Modern distinctions between "Syrian" and "Syriac" (Christianity) are observed in English language as a partially accepted convention, but such distinctions do not exist in most of the other languages, nor on the endonymic (native) level among adherents of Syriac Christianity. Native terms (ethnonyms, demonyms, linguonyms) that were derived from the name of Syria did not possess a distinctive formal duality that would be equivalent to the conventional English distinction between terms Syrian and Syriac. Since the proposed distinction is not yet universally accepted among scholars, its individual and often inconsistent application has created a complex narrative, that is additionally burdened by older problems, inherited from terminological controversies that originated much earlier, within Syriac studies in particular, and also within Aramaic studies in general.

The use of Syrian/Syriac labels was also challenged by common scholarly reduction of Syriac Christianity to the Eastern Aramaic Christian heritage, and its offspring. Such reduction was detaching Syriac Christianity from Western Aramaic Christian traditions, that were enrooted in the very homeland of Christianity, encompassing ancient Aramaic-speaking communities in Judea and Palestine, with Galilee and Samaria, and also those in the regions of Nabatea and Palmyrene to the east, and Phoenicia and Syria proper to the north. Since Western Aramaic Christians did not fit into narrow scholarly definition of Syriac Christianity, focused on Eastern Aramaic traditions, various researchers have opted for an additional use of some wider terms, like "Aramaic Christianity", or "Aramaic Christendom", thus designating a religious, cultural and linguistic continuum, encompassing the entire branch of Christianity that stemmed from the first Aramaic-speaking Christian communities, formed in apostolic times, and then continued to develop throughout history, mainly in the Near East and also in several other regions of Asia, including India and China.

In English language, the term Aramaic Christianity should not be confused with term Aramean Christianity, since the first designation is linguistically defined and thus refers to Aramaic-speaking Christians in general, while the second designation is more specific and refers only to Christian Arameans.

History 

Christianity began in the Near East, in Jerusalem among Aramaic-speaking Jews. It soon spread to other Aramaic-speaking Semitic peoples like Aramaic pagan peoples along the Eastern Mediterranean coast and also to the inland parts of the Roman Empire and beyond that into the Parthian Empire and the later Sasanian Empire, including Mesopotamia, which was dominated at different times and to varying extents by these empires.

The ruins of the Dura-Europos church, dating from the first half of the 3rd century are concrete evidence of the presence of organized Christian communities in the Aramaic-speaking area, far from Jerusalem and the Mediterranean coast, and there are traditions of the preaching of Christianity in the region as early as the time of the Apostles.

However, "virtually every aspect of Syriac Christianity prior to the fourth century remains obscure, and it is only then that one can feel oneself on firmer ground". The fourth century is marked by the many writings in Syriac of Saint Ephrem the Syrian, the Demonstrations of the slightly older Aphrahat and the anonymous ascetical Book of Steps. Ephrem lived in the Roman Empire, close to the border with the Sasanian Empire, to which the other two writers belonged. However, another source claims there is a significant amount of evidence from the fourth century and before about liturgical practices.

Other items of early literature of Syriac Christianity are the Diatessaron of Tatian, the Curetonian Gospels and the Syriac Sinaiticus, the Peshitta Bible and the Doctrine of Addai.

The bishops who took part in the First Council of Nicea (325), the first of the ecumenical councils, included twenty from Syria and one from Persia, outside the Roman Empire. Two councils held in the following century divided Syriac Christianity into two opposing parties.

East-West theological contrast 

Syriac Christianity is divided on several theological issues, both Christological and Pneumatological.

In 431, the Council of Ephesus, which is reckoned as the third ecumenical council, condemned Nestorius and Nestorianism. That condemnation was consequently ignored by the East Syriac Church of the East, which had been previously established in the Sasanian Empire as a distinct Church at the Council of Seleucia-Ctesiphon in 410, and which at the Synod of Dadisho in 424 had declared the independence of its head, the Catholicos, in relation to "western" (Roman Empire) Church authorities. Even in its modern form of Assyrian Church of the East and Ancient Church of the East, it honours Nestorius as a teacher and saint.

In 451, the Council of Chalcedon, the fourth ecumenical council, condemned Monophysitism, and also rejected Dyoprosopism. This council was rejected by the Oriental Orthodox Churches (among which is the Syriac Orthodox Church) that use the West Syriac Rite. The Patriarchate of Antioch was consequently divided between two communities, pro-Chalcedonian and non-Chalcedonian. The Chalcedonians were often labelled as 'Melkites' (Imperials), while their opponents were labelled Monophysites (those who believe in the one rather than two natures of Christ) and Jacobites (after Jacob Baradaeus).

In 553, the Council of Constantinople, the fifth ecumenical council, anathematized Theodore of Mopsuestia, and also condemned several writings of Theodoret of Cyrus and Ibas of Edessa (see: Three-Chapter Controversy). Since those three theologians were highly regarded among Eastern Syriac Christians, further rifts were created, culminating in 612, when a major council of the Church of the East was held in Seleucia-Ctesiphon. Presided by Babai the Great (d. 628), the council officially adopted specific Christological formulations, using Syriac term qnoma (ܩܢܘܡܐ) as designation for dual (divine and human) properties within one prosopon (person) of Christ.

Theological estrangement between East Syriac and West Syriac branches was manifested as a prolonged rivalry, that was particularly intensive between the Church of the East and the Maphrianate of the East (Syriac Orthodox Church), with each branch claiming that its doctrines were not heretical while also accusing the other of teaching heresy. Their theological estrangement has persisted through the medieval and early modern periods and into the present era. In 1999, the Coptic Orthodox Church, a sister-church of the Syriac Orthodox Church, blocked admittance of the Assyrian Church of the East to the Middle East Council of Churches, which has among its members the Chaldean Catholic Church, and demanded that it remove from its liturgy the mention of Diodorus of Tarsus, Theodore of Mopsuestia and Nestorius, whom it venerates as "the Greek doctors".

East-West liturgical contrast 

The liturgies of the East and West Syriacs are quite distinct. The East Syriac Rite is noted especially for its eucharistic Qurbana of Addai and Mari, in which the Words of Institution are absent. West Syriacs use the Syro-Antiochian or West Syriac Rite, which belongs to the family of liturgies known as the Antiochene Rite.

The Syriac Orthodox Church adds to the Trisagion ("Holy God, Holy Mighty, Holy Immortal, have mercy on us") the phrase "who were crucified for us". The Church of the East interpreted this as heretical. Patriarch Timothy I of the Church of the East declared: "And also in all the countries of Babylon, of Persia, and of Assyria, and in all the countries of the sunrise, that is to say, among the Indians, the Chinese, the Tibetans, the Turks, and in all the provinces under the jurisdiction of this Patriarchal See, there is no addition of Crucifixus es pro nobis".

Among the Saint Thomas Christians of India, the East Syriac Rite was the one originally used, but those who in the 17th century accepted union with the Syriac Orthodox Church adopted the rite of that church.

Further divisions 

A schism in 1552 in the Church of the East gave rise to a separate patriarchate, which at first entered into union with the Catholic Church but later formed the nucleus of the present-day Assyrian Church of the East and Ancient Church of the East, while at the end of the 18th century most followers of the earlier patriarchate chose union with Rome and, with some others, now form the Chaldean Catholic Church.

In India, all of the Saint Thomas Christians are still collectively called "Syrian Christians". The majority of the Saint Thomas Christians, who initially depended on the Church of the East, maintained union with Rome in spite of discomforts felt at Latinization by their Portuguese rulers and clergy, against which they protested. They now form the Syro-Malabar Catholic Church. A small group, which split from these in the early 19th century, united at the beginning of the 20th century, under the name of Chaldean Syrian Church, with the Assyrian Church of the East.

Those who in 1653 broke with the Catholic Church as dominated by the Portuguese in India and soon chose union with the Syriac Orthodox Church later split into various groups. The first separation was that of the Malabar Independent Syrian Church in 1772. At the end of the 19th century and in the course of the 20th, a division arose among those who remained united with the Syriac Orthodox Church who insisted on full autocephaly and are now called the Malankara Orthodox Syrian Church and those, the Jacobite Syrian Christian Church, who remain faithful to the patriarch.

A reunion movement led in 1930 to the establishment of full communion between some of the Malankara Syrian Orthodox and the Catholic Church. They now form the Syro-Malankara Catholic Church.

In the Middle East, the newly enthroned patriarch of the Syriac Orthodox Church, Ignatius Michael III Jarweh, declared himself a Catholic and, having received confirmation from Rome in 1783, became the head of the Syriac Catholic Church.

In the 19th and 20th centuries many Syriac Christians, both East and West, left the Middle East for other lands, creating a substantial diaspora.

In modern times, several Churches of Syriac tradition are actively participating in ecumenical dialogue.

Terms for Syriac Christians

Indigenous Aramaic-speaking communities of the Near East adopted Christianity very early, perhaps already from the first century, and began to abandon their three-millennia-old traditional ancient Mesopotamian religion, although this religion did not fully die out until as late as the tenth century. The kingdom of Osroene, with the capital city of Edessa, was absorbed into the Roman Empire in 114 as a semi-autonomous vassal state and then, after a period under the supremacy of Parthian Empire, was incorporated as a Roman province, first in 214, and finally in 242.

In 431 the Council of Ephesus declared Nestorianism a heresy. Nestorians, persecuted in the Byzantine Empire, sought refuge in the parts of Mesopotamia that were part of the Sasanian Empire. This encouraged acceptance of Nestorian doctrine by the Persian Church of the East, which spread Christianity outside Persia, to India, China, Tibet and Mongolia, expanding the range of this eastern branch of Syriac Christianity. The western branch, the Jacobite Church, appeared after the Council of Chalcedon's condemnation of Miaphysitism in 451.

Churches of Syriac traditions 
West Syriac Rite 
 Oriental Orthodox
 The Syriac Orthodox Church (Non-Chalcedonian Oriental Orthodox Church of Antioch and all the East)
 The Jacobite Syrian Christian Church (Non-Chalcedonian Oriental Orthodox Church of India, within the Syriac Orthodox Patriarchate)
 The Malankara Orthodox Syrian Church (Autocephalous, Non-Chalcedonian Oriental Orthodox Church, based in Kerala, India, along with its constituent, the Brahmavar (Goan) Orthodox Church)
 The Malabar Independent Syrian Church or the Thozhiyur church (Independent Oriental Orthodox Church, based in Kerala, India, not part of the Oriental Orthodox Communion)
 Eastern Catholic Churches
 The Maronite Catholic Church
 The Syriac Catholic Church
 The Syro-Malankara Catholic Church (Syrian Catholic Church based in Kerala, India)
 Eastern Protestant Churches
 The Mar Thoma Syrian Church of Malabar, linked in full communion with the Anglican Communion
 The St. Thomas Evangelical Church of India, of Evangelical-style theology

East Syriac Rite
 Church of the East
 The Assyrian Church of the East, traditionalist continuation that emerged from the Shimun line of patriarchs of the Church of the East that took this name in 1976
 The Chaldean Syrian Church an archbishopric in India of the Assyrian Church of the East
 The Ancient Church of the East, split from the Assyrian Church of the East in the 1960s.
 The East Syriac Churches within the Catholic Communion
 The Chaldean Catholic Church, an Eastern Catholic Church that emerged from the Elia line of patriarchs of the Church of the East following splits in 1552, 1667/1668 and 1779
 The Syro(Syriac) Malabar Church (Eastern Catholic Church based in Kerala that is independent from the Chaldean Catholic hierarchy since the Synod of Diamper in 1599.)
East Syriac Christians were involved in the mission to India, and many of the present Churches in India are in communion with either East or West Syriac Churches. These Indian Christians are known as Saint Thomas Christians.

In modern times, even apart from the Eastern Protestant denominations like Mar Thoma Syrian Church of Malabar and St. Thomas Evangelical Church of India, which originated from Churches of the West Syriac Rite, various Evangelical denominations continue to send representatives among Syriac Christians. As a result, several Evangelical groups have been established, particularly the Assyrian Pentecostal Church (mostly in America, Iran, and Iraq) from East Syriac Christians, and the Aramean Free Church (mostly in Germany, Sweden, America and Syria) from West Syriac Christians. Because of their new (Protestant) theology these are sometimes not classified as traditional Churches of Syriac Christianity.

See also

 Assyrian people
 Saint Thomas Christian denominations

Citations

General and cited sources

External links

 Jacobite Syrian Church
  – Translation into English Syriac Christianity on WikiSyr
  – Translation into English Syriac Catholic Circle
 Qambel Maran- Syriac chants from South India- a review and liturgical music tradition of Syriac Christians revisited
 Traditions and rituals among the Syrian Christians of Kerala
 Audio Aramaic-Bible
 The Center for the Study of Christianity: A Comprehensive Bibliography on Syriac Christianity